The Tomago aluminium smelter is located at Tomago, New South Wales, Australia, approximately 13 km west of Newcastle, within the Port Stephens LGA. The smelter has a production capacity of 590,000 tonnes of aluminium (ingot, billet and slab) per year. 
It is operated by Tomago Aluminium Company, an independently managed joint venture owned by:
 Rio Tinto Alcan,  51.55%
 Gove Aluminium Finance Ltd, 36.05% (owned 70% by CSR Limited and 30% by AMP Limited)
 Hydro Aluminium, 12.40%

History
The Tomago plant was started in 1983 using Pechiney AP18 technology. Two potlines with 240 pots each were built and operated at 181 kiloamperes (kA) for a production of 240,000 tonnes per year. In 1993, a third AP18 potline with 280 pots was commissioned.
After potline 3 start up, current on the three potlines was 182 kA for a production of 385,000 tonnes per year. In 1998, the potlines 1 and 2 were extended with 20 pots at the end of each room, making 280 cell per line. The production of Tomago was increased by 50,000 tonnes to 435,000 tonnes per year. In 2002 the plant commenced the AP22 project to reach the a line current of 226 kA in 2007.

As at 2017, it is the largest consumer of electricity in New South Wales accounting for 12% of total capacity.

Technology
The smelter currently comprises three potlines of 280 Pechiney AP18 (AP22) reduction cells each.

See also 
 List of aluminium smelters

References

External links 
 Tomago Aluminium corporate web site

Aluminium smelters in Australia
Port Stephens Council
Rio Tinto (corporation) subsidiaries
Economy of Newcastle, New South Wales